David Levy is an American computer scientist and professor at University of Washington Information School.  He is known for his research, writing, and teaching on the prevention of information overload.

Biography
David Levy attended Stanford University and received a PhD in computer science in 1979.  He also earned a degree at Roehampton Institute, London, in calligraphy and bookbinding in 1982. He was a member of the Xerox Palo Alto Research Center (PARC) for 15 years (until December, 1999).  At PARC, he researched the nature of documents and the tools and practices through which they are created and used. His current research focuses on information and the quality of life. His book, Scrolling Forward: Making Sense of Documents in the Digital Age, was published by Arcade Publishing in 2001. In 2016, he released a book titled Mindful Tech: How to Bring Balance to Our Digital Lives, published by Yale University Press, surrounding how individuals and societies might "live healthy, reflective, and productive lives" with technology

Publications
Levy, David M. (2016). Mindful Tech: How to Bring Balance to Our Digital Lives. Yale University Press. .
 
Levy, David M. (2008). Information Overload. In Kenneth E. Himma and Herman T. Tavani (Ed.), The Handbook of Information and Computer Ethics (pp. 497–516). Hoboken, New Jersey: John Wiley & Sons. .
Levy, David M. (2005). Robots Unlimited: Life in a Virtual Age. .

References

Further reading
Levy, David.  (March 5, 2008). No Time to Think. Google Tech Talks.
Seven, Richard. (November 28, 2004). Life, Interrupted. Pacific Northwest.
Sowa, Tom. (June 25, 2007). In search of a little down time. The Spokesman-Review.

External links
Official website

Year of birth missing (living people)
Living people
American computer scientists
University of Washington faculty
Stanford University alumni
Scientists at PARC (company)